"Breathe" is the first single by Norwegian electronic dance music record production trio Seeb, with vocals by Portuguese singer Bernardo Neves, known by his stage name Neev.

Background 
The song was written by Tiago Carvalho, Bernardo Neves, Espen Berg and Simen Eriksrud, with the latter two producing the song. It was made available for digital download on 11 March 2016 through Seeb Music, Island Records, Virgin Records and Universal Music Group.

Charts

Weekly charts

Year-end charts

Certifications

Release history

References

2016 songs
2016 singles
Seeb (music producers) songs
Island Records singles
Virgin Records singles
Universal Music Group singles
Tropical house songs
Song recordings produced by Seeb (music producers)
Songs written by Espen Berg (musician)
Songs written by Simen Eriksrud